Soběkury is a municipality and village in Plzeň-South District in the Plzeň Region of the Czech Republic. It has about 600 inhabitants.

Administrative parts
The village of Horušany is an administrative part of Soběkury.

Geography
It lies on the border between the Švihov Highlands and Plasy Uplands. The Dnešický Stream springs here and flows through the municipality.

History
The first written mention of Soběkury is from 1239. The village of Horušany was first mentioned in 1379. During the Hussite Wars, Soběkury was badly damaged and Horušany was completely destroyed. Soběkury again suffered during the Thirty Years' War, but prosperity and economic development took place in the first half of the 18th century. At the end of the 18th century, Horušany was restored and resettled. From 1692 until the establishment of an independent municipality in 1850, the area was part of the Merklín estate and shared its owners.

Sights
There are two chapels. The Chapel of the Exaltation of the Holy Cross in the centre of Soběkury was built in 1829. The Chapel of the Virgin Mary in Horušany dates from the second half of the 19th century.

Notable people
Václav Robert Bozděch (1912–1980), air gunner

Gallery

References

External links

Villages in Plzeň-South District